Jan III Sobieski High School in Kraków is a high school in Kraków, Poland. It was founded in 1883.

History
The school was founded as a tribute to King Jan III Sobieski and his victory at battle of Vienna. The new building, which is still the location of Jan III Sobieski High School was completed in 1887. The students took part in both World Wars, fighting for the independence of Poland.

During the Nazi occupation of Poland, the Germans made an office building of the school and destroyed the book collection. After the Wehrmacht left Kraków, the school was first in the city that started holding classes again.

Since 1969 the school has been an organizer of a theatrical contest Festiwal Małych Form Teatralnych (Small Theatrical Forms Festival), where many famous Polish actors started their careers.

A student of Sobieski High School, Przemysław Mazur, was awarded a gold medal at the International Mathematical Olympiad in 2006, 2007 and 2008.

Sobieski High School is a member of Towarzystwo Szkół Twórczych (en. Society of Creative Schools) – movement of Polish schools willing to share experiences in order to increase students' development. Since 2009 it's also a part of international network of schools teaching German language Schulen: Partner der Zukunft (en. Schools: Partners of Future).

Facilities
The library holds approximately 20000 books, among which 10% are dated before 1939. Core of the collection is built of popular scientific positions covering all sciences. Students can also check out books published in foreign languages including English, German, French and Russian.

Sobieski High School officially opened a new athletic center with sports hall, two-level gym and fitness room in September 2008. Costs of the investment were around 2.5 mln USD (7.2 mln PLN).

Famous alumni
 Jan Stanisław Bystroń – sociologist and ethnographer
 Leon Chwistek – painter, philosopher
 Andrzej Duda – President of Poland
 Filip Eisenberg – bacteriologist 
 Wlastimil Hofman – painter
 Tadeusz Hołuj – writer
 Marian Jedlicki – historian 
 Zdzisław Krygowski – mathematician
 Józef Lustgarten – soccer player 
 Franciszek Macharski – archbishop of Kraków
 Bronisław Malinowski – anthropologist
 Tadeusz Peiper – poet
 Edward Raczyński – president of Poland in exile
 Henryk Reyman – soccer player
 Jan Marcin Szancer – illustrator
 Tomasz Szczypiński – politician
 Jan Sztaudynger – poet, satirist
 Jerzy Turowicz – journalist
 Mariusz Ziółko – professor of electronics
 Jerzy Zubrzycki – sociologist
 Maciej Stuhr - actor, comedian

Famous tutors
 Leon Chwistek (also an alumnus)
 Władysław Czapliński
 Agata Kornhauser-Duda

Cultural references
The semi-biographical movie Mała matura 1947 by Janusz Majewski released in 2010 tells a story of a young boy, Ludwik, who moved along with his family from Lviv to Kraków and attended Sobieski High School. The film won an honorary Special Award at the 35th Polish Film Festival.

See also
 Nowodworek

References

External links

 Official Website

High schools in Poland
Educational institutions established in 1883
Education in Kraków
1883 establishments in Austria-Hungary